LA Shrinks is an American reality documentary television series on Bravo and premiered on March 4, 2013.

Premise
LA Shrinks follows the daily professional and personal lives of three Los Angeles-based shrinks.

Cast

Eris Huemer
Dr. Eris Huemer has degrees from Pacifica Graduate Institute and the online Ryokan College, and is licensed as a marriage and family therapist in California and works as a "life coach". She is married to Clayton Winans and has one boy, Phoenix Winans.

Venus Nicolino
Venus Nicolino has a Doctor of Philosophy in clinical psychology from the California School of Professional Psychology but is not licensed as a therapist or psychologist. She works as a "life consultant" and lives in Bel Air, Los Angeles with her husband Matthew Johnson, their two sons, ages 3 and 5, and her two nephews, ages 5 and 7.

Gregory Cason
Greg Cason has a Doctor of Philosophy in counseling psychology from the University of Houston. and is a licensed psychologist located in Beverly Hills who specializes in cognitive therapy with individuals and couples. Kevin Beer is his partner of 23 years and the couple is in the process of planning their wedding. They reside in West Hollywood.

Episodes

References

2010s American reality television series
2013 American television series debuts
2013 American television series endings
English-language television shows
Bravo (American TV network) original programming